Echegaray (from Basque Etxegarai) is a surname meaning Hillhouse. Notable people with the surname include:

José Echegaray (1832–1916), Spanish mathematician, dramatist and statesman
Leo Echegaray (1960–1999), Filipino criminal

See also
Etchegaray

Basque-language surnames